Léonid Alexandrovich Ouspensky (1902–1987) was a famous Russian icon painter and art historian.

He was born in 1902 on his father's estate in the village of Golaia Snova (now Golosnovka) in the north of the Voronezh region in Russia and died in 1987.

Ouspensky specialised in both the painting and study of icons. He studied and taught art in Paris.

One of his students was the Egyptian Coptic icon painter and scholar Isaac Fanous.

References

20th-century Russian painters
Russian male painters
Russian icon painters
Russian art historians
1902 births
1987 deaths
20th-century Russian historians
20th-century Russian male artists